The Moon's Our Home is a 1936 American comedy film directed by William A. Seiter. It was adapted from a novel of the same name written by Faith Baldwin and first published in serial form in Cosmopolitan magazine.

Plot summary
A comedy about marriage and everything relating to it. New York novelist Henry Fonda meets up with an actress, Margaret Sullavan, and the two date and later marry, though neither knows of the other's fame. The real adventure begins on the honeymoon, when this screwball comedy really heats up with insults and arguments.

Cast

Reception
The film recorded a loss of $111,845.

Writing for The Spectator in 1936, Graham Greene gave the film a good review, describing it as "a trivial charming comedy". Greene praised Dorothy Parker's comedy writing and the acting of Margaret Sullavan and Henry Fonda for providing "the sense of something fresh and absurd and civilized".

On radio
Lux Radio Theatre aired a one-hour adaptation of the film on February 10, 1941, with James Stewart and Carole Lombard in the leading roles.

References

External links
 
 

1936 films
1936 romantic comedy films
American black-and-white films
American romantic comedy films
American screwball comedy films
1930s English-language films
Films based on American novels
Films directed by William A. Seiter
Films produced by Walter Wanger
Films set in New Hampshire
Films set in New York City
Paramount Pictures films
Films based on works by Faith Baldwin
1930s American films